The Darmstadt D-22 was a sports-plane of Germany, designed and built by Akaflieg of Technische Universität Darmstadt.

Design and development
The aircraft was designed by F. Fecher in the Akaflieg (academic group of flyers) of Technische Universität Darmstadt. It was a development of Darmstadt D-18, slightly enlarged, more streamlined and fitted with an inline engine. Thanks to strengthening it was better fit to aerobatics. Two were built in 1931.

Just like the D-18, the D-22 was a cantilever biplane, with an upper wing placed low above a fuselage and ahead of a lower wing. Aerodynamic cleanliness and low weight were emphasisedin the design, resulting in a small aircraft with clean lines.

Description
The D-22 was of wooden construction with cantilever biplane and oval cross-section fuselage skinned with plywood and fabric on parts of the single-spar wings, which could be dismounted and folded rearwards. The two crew sat in open cockpits in tandem, with windshields. The landing gear was fixed with a rear fuselage skid. The engine was mounted in the fuselage nose and drove a two-bladed fixed-pitch propeller. Fuel was supplied from a  tank in the fuselage.

Operational history
The second aircraft, D-2222, a D-22a, took part in the Challenge 1932 international tourist aircraft contest, piloted by Walter Marienfeld. It was handicapped in technical trials, especially the short landing trial, not having flaps or slats, being relegated to 35th place, from 43 participants, after this section. In the maximum speed trial it was beaten only by the five Heinkel He 64s, reaching . As a result, it completed the contest in 17th place. Re-registered as D-EQIN from 1933, it was in use for several years after the Challenges.

Specifications (D-22)

References

Further reading

External links

D-22 photos and drawings at Akaflieg Darmstadt page
 </ref>

1930s German sport aircraft
Akaflieg Darmstadt aircraft
Single-engined tractor aircraft
Biplanes
Aircraft first flown in 1931